Alfred-Marie-Joseph-Louis Montagne (20 June 1881 – 26 February 1963) was a French general who commanded the 15th Army Corps during the Battle of France (1940). He was responsible for the defence of Menton during the Italian invasion. He published a recollection of the war, La bataille pour Nice et la Provence (Montpellier: Éditions des Arceaux), in 1952.

Montagne was born at Pézenas. In the First World War he was wounded and cited in dispatches five times. He received the Légion d'honneur and the Croix de Guerre. He replaced General Henri Dentz at the head of the 15th Army Corps in 1939. Like his superior, René Olry, he was an artillery officer by training. His knowledge of the terrain of the Maritime Alps was exquisite.

References

1881 births
1963 deaths
People from Pézenas
French generals
French military personnel of World War I
French military personnel of World War II
Grand Officiers of the Légion d'honneur
Recipients of the Croix de Guerre (France)